Falling Awake (originally titled Shine On) is a 2009 musical drama film directed by Agustín Fernández, who co-wrote it with Michael Baez and Doug Klozzner. Andrew Cisneros stars as a Latino musician in New York City who attempts to overcome the problems of his poor neighborhood. It premiered at the New York International Latino Film Festival and was released in the U.S. on January 29, 2010.

Plot
Jay, a young Latino musician, attempts to rise above the poverty and violence in his Bronx neighborhood.

Cast
 Andrew Cisneros as Jay
 Jenna Dewan as Alessandra
 Nestor Serrano as Jay's Father
 Nicholas Gonzalez as Eddie
 Julie Carmen as Angela

Release 
Falling Awake premiered at the New York International Latino Film Festival on July 24, 2009. IFC Films released it in the US on January 29, 2010, and it grossed $1,978.

Reception 
Rotten Tomatoes, a review aggregator, reports that 25% of eight surveyed critics gave the film a positive review; the average rating is 3.7/10. Metacritic rated it 24/100 based on four reviews. John Anderson of Variety wrote that it "recycles every imaginable trope". Mike Hale of The New York Times wrote that it balances "appealing performances" against the cliches of ethnic coming-of-age films. Ben Walters of The Guardian wrote although the story and characters are clichéd, the "performances are engaging, particularly Cisneros".

References

External links 
 

2009 films
2000s musical drama films
American musical drama films
American coming-of-age films
Films set in the Bronx
2009 drama films
2000s English-language films
2000s American films